Club Ourense Baloncesto, S.A.D., more commonly referred to today by its sponsorship name of Río Ourense Termal, is a professional basketball team based in Ourense, Spain. The team currently plays in league LEB Oro.

History
Founded in 1978 as Club Bosco-Salesianos, the club achieved its first success promoting to Segunda División in 1984.

Two years later, Ourense advances to Primera División B, the second tier, where it plays three seasons before promoting to Liga ACB in 1989 as champion of the league.

In the top league, COB plays during nine seasons alternating title and relegation playoffs in its first years. Finally, it is relegated to LEB Oro in the 1998 playoffs, the third series the club played in three consecutive seasons.

Ourense only played ACB again in the 2000–01 season before falling to LEB Plata, the third category in 2005. COB came back to LEB Oro in 2009 after buying the vacant spot of Cantabria Lobos.

On June 2, 2015, Ourense promoted again to Liga ACB fourteen years since its relegation but could not play in the league because the assembly of the league rejected its entry. However, on September 17, 2015, the assembly of the league ratified the promotion to the 2016–17 season, independently of the position at the 2015–16 LEB Oro. However, despite this agreement, Ourense could not finally promote the next season.

Players

Current roster

Depth chart

Season by season

Notable players

Trophies and awards
2nd division championships: (1)
1ª División B: (1) 1989
Copa Príncipe de Asturias: (1)
2000
Copa LEB Plata: (1)
2007
Copa Galicia: (7)
1992, 1994, 1995, 1997, 1999, 2001, 2006

References

External links
Official website

Basketball teams established in 1979
1979 establishments in Spain
Basketball teams in Galicia (Spain)
LEB Oro teams
Sport in Ourense